Bazaruto may refer to:
Bazaruto Archipelago, Mozambique
Bazaruto Island, Mozambique
Bazaruto National Park, Mozambique